Operation or Operations may refer to:

Arts, entertainment and media 

 Operation (game), a battery-operated board game that challenges dexterity
 Operation (music), a term used in musical set theory
 Operations (magazine), Multi-Man Publishing's house organ for articles and discussion about its wargaming products
 The Operation (film), a 1973 British television film
 The Operation (1990), a crime, drama, TV movie starring Joe Penny, Lisa Hartman, and Jason Beghe
 The Operation (1992–1998), a reality television series from TLC
 The Operation M.D., formerly The Operation, a Canadian garage rock band
 "Operation", a song by Relient K from The Creepy EP, 2001

Business 

 Business operations, the harvesting of value from assets owned by a business
 Manufacturing operations, operation of a facility
 Operations management, an area of management concerned with designing and controlling the process of production

Military and law enforcement 

 Military operation, a military action (usually in a military campaign) using deployed forces
 Black operation, or "Black op", an operation that may be outside of standard military protocol or against the law
 Clandestine operation, an intelligence or military operation carried out so that the operation goes unnoticed
 Combined operations, operations by forces of two or more allied nations
 Covert operation, an operation which conceals the identity of the sponsor
 Psychological operations, an operation consisting of psychological manipulations, tactics, and warfare
 Special operations, military operations that are unconventional
 Operations (J3), third level of Nation Level Command Structure
 Operations (military staff), staff involved in planning operations
 Sting operation, an operation designed to catch a person committing a crime, by means of deception

Science and technology 

 Inference, a step in reasoning
 Information technology operations
 Operation (mathematics), a calculation from zero or more input values (called operands) to an output value
 Arity, number of arguments or operands that the function takes
 Binary operation, calculation that combines two elements of the set to produce another element of the set
 Graph operations, produce new graphs from initial ones
 Modulo operation, operation finds the remainder after division of one number by another
 Operations research, in British usage, application of advanced analytical methods to make better decisions
 Unary operation, an operation with only one operand
 Rail transport operations, the control of a rail system
 Scientific operation
 Surgical operation or surgery, in medicine
 Unit operation, a basic step in a chemical engineering process

Other uses 

 Anomalous operation, in parapsychology, a term describing a broad category of purported paranormal effects
 Operation, a word which represents a grammatical relation (i.e., function) or instruction, rather than a term or name
 Operation of law, a legal term that indicates that a right or liability has been created for a party

See also 

 List of military operations
 OP (disambiguation)
 Operations support system, used in the telecommunications industry
 Operations room, the tactical center providing processed information for command and control of an area of operations
 Operative (disambiguation)
 Operator (disambiguation)